This is a list of foreign players who have been played in the Persian Gulf Pro League from 2001 onwards. The following players have been born outside Iran and have not been capped for the Iranian national football team at any level.
Players in bold have capped for their national teams.
For a list of players before 2001 see List of foreign footballers in Iran 1920 to 2000.

Afghanistan 
Faysal Shayesteh – Paykan – 2017

Albania
Xhevahir Sukaj – Sepahan – 2012 to 2015
Ervin Bulku – Sepahan – 2012 to 2014
Ditmar Bicaj – Tractor Sazi – 2014
Edon Hasani – Sepahan – 2018

Algeria
Okacha Hamzaoui – Tractor – 2020 to 2021

Angola
Carlos – Foolad – 2008 to 2009

Argentina
Miguel Barreto – Paykan – 2006
Gabriel Iribarren – Zob Ahan – 2009 to 2010

Armenia

Armen Sahakyan – Tractor Sazi – 2001 to 2002
Arshak Amiryan – Bargh Shiraz – 2001 to 2002
Mher Avanesyan – Bargh Shiraz – 2001 to 2002
Mayis Azizyan – Bargh Shiraz – 2001 to 2004
Ashot Dadamyan – Tractor Sazi – 2001 to 2002
Adam Hayerapetyan – Tractor Sazi – 2001 to 2002
Garnik Hovhannisyan – Tractor Sazi – 2001 to 2002
Felix Khojoyan – Esteghlal Rasht and Pegah Gilan – 2001 to 2002 and 2003 to 2005
Armenak Petrosyan – Sepahan and Zob Ahan – 2001 to 2007
Levon Stepanyan – Sepahan, Zob Ahan – 2002 to 2006
Hamlet Mkhitaryan – PAS Hamedan, Rah Ahan, Damash Gilan and Gahar Zagros – 2006 to 2013
Aghvan Mkrtchyan – Bargh Shiraz – 2007
Alexander Tadevosyan – Bargh Shiraz – 2007
Armen Ghazaryan – Zob Ahan – 2007
Armen Tigranyan – Zob Ahan – 2007 to 2008
Gevorg Kasparov – PAS Tehran and Rah Ahan – 2007 to 2008
Levon Pachajyan – Sanat Naft Abadan – 2009 to present 2012
Arthur Yedigaryan – PAS Hamedan – 2009 to 2011
Vahagn Minasyan – Rah Ahan – 2010 to 2011
Grigor Meliksetyan – Mes Sarcheshme, Paykan and Gahar Zagros – 2010 to 2013 
Ararat Arakelyan – Mes Kerman – 2011 to 2012
Valeri Aleksanyan – Sanat Naft Abadan and Rah Ahan – 2011 to 2013 and 2013 to 2014
Hrayr Mkoyan – Esteghlal – 2014 to 2017
Varazdat Haroyan – Padideh – 2016 to 2017
Levon Hayrapetyan – Paykan – 2016 to 2017

Austria
Christopher Knett–Sepahan, Foolad 2021 to present

Australia
Liam Reddy –   Esteghlal – 2012
Milan Susak – Sepahan – 2013
Iain Fyfe – Mes Kerman – 2013 to 2014
Antony Golec – Persepolis – 2016

Azerbaijan
Mushfig Huseynov - Paykan 2001 to 2002
Pasha Aliyev - Aboomoslem - 2001 to 2002
Ramiz Mammadov - Paykan 2001 to 2003, Pegah Gilan 2003 to 2004
Rafat Kuliev - Esteghlal and Sanat Naft - 2001 to 2003
Tarlan Ahmadov - Esteghlal - 2002 to 2003
Farrukh Ismayilov - Sanat Naft 2002 to 2003
Itma Qurbanov - Pegah Gilan
Mahmud Qurbanov - Foolad - 2002 to 2003
Rashad Sadygov - Foolad - 2002 to 2003
Ilham Yadullayev - Sanat Naft 2002 to 2003
Sergey Koriev - Zob Ahan - 2003 to 2004

Benin
Rudy Gestede – Esteghlal – 2021 to 2022

Bolivia
Vicente Arze – Esteghlal – 2012 to 2013

Bosnia and Herzegovina
Almir Tolja - Saba Battery - 2005 to 2009
Alen Avdić - Saba Battery, Bargh Shiraz - 2006 to 2009
Marinko Mačkić - Saba Battery - 2006 to 2008
Enes Mešanović - Bargh Shiraz - 2006
Faruk Ihtijarević - PAS Hamedan - 2007 to 2008
Ivan Savorjest - Aboomoslem - 2007 to 2008
Emir Obuća - PAS Hamedan, Rah Ahan - 2007 to 2008 and 2009 to 2010
Fuad Salihović - Aboomoslem - 2008
Tomislav Stanić - Malavan - 2008 to 2009
Alen Bašić - Malavan - 2008 to 2012
Nenad Timkov - Bargh Shiraz - 2008 to 2009
Mladen Bartolović - Foolad - 2009 to 2010
Samir Bekrić - Mes Kerman 2013 to 2014, Fajr Sepasi - 2014
Muamer Svraka - Paykan - 2014 to 2015
Ratko Dujković - Saipa - 2015 to 2016
Senijad Ibričić - Sepahan - 2016
Sulejman Krpić - Tractor Sazi - 2018

Brazil

Adriano Alves - Esteghlal Ahvaz F.C., Mes Kerman F.C., Saipa F.C., Pegah F.C., Damash Gilan F.C., Malavan F.C. - 2001 to 2010
Roger Fabrizio - Esteghlal F.C. - 2003 to 2004
Fabio Luciano Pereira Da Silva - Sanat Naft Abadan - 2003 to 2004
Rafael Gomes dos Santos - Esteghlal F.C. - 2003 to 2004
Eduardo Silva de Andrade - F.C. Aboomoslem - 2003 to 2004
Fabio de Lima Pinto - Esteghlal F.C. - 2004 to 2005
Jose Carlos Pimentel Filho - Esteghlal F.C. - 2004 to 2005
Rodrigo Regio da Rosa - Sepahan S.C. - 2005 to 2006
Maxwell Santos Silva - Esteghlal F.C. - 2005 to 2006
Ednado Moro - Mes Kerman F.C. - 2005 to 2007
Rodrigo Batista Andrade Da Silva - Shahid Ghandi F.C. - 2005 to 2006
Julio César Pavia - Shahid Ghandi F.C. - 2005 to 2006
Denis dos Santos - Shahid Ghandi F.C. - 2005 to 2006
Carlos Roberto da Silva Santos - Shahid Ghandi F.C. - 2005 to 2006
Joílson Rodrigues da Silva - F.C. Zob Ahan, Esteghlal F.C. - 2005 to 2007
Fábio Carvalho - Zob Ahan - 2006 to 2007, 2007 to 2008, 2012 to 2013
Fábio Hempel - Foolad F.C. - 2007 
Fábio Januário - Foolad F.C., Esteghlal F.C., Sepahan F.C. - 2007, 2008 to 2013
Evandro Silva Resende - Saipa F.C. - 2007 to 2008
Fabricio Carlos Costa Bento - Esteghlal Ahvaz F.C. - 2007 to 2009
Leonardo André Pimenta Faria - Sanat Naft Abadan F.C., Tractor Sazi F.C., Gostaresh Foolad - 2007 to 2008, 2009 to 2011, 2014 to 2016
Renato Medeiros - Sanat Naft Abadan F.C. - 2007 to 2008
Paulo Roberto da Silva Zaltron - Mes Kerman F.C. - 2007 to 2010
Edinho - Mes Kerman F.C., Tractor Sazi F.C. - 2007 to 2011, 2013 to 2015,2016 to 2017
Rodrigo Teixeira - F.C. Aboomoslem - 2007
Ivan da Silva - Rah Ahan F.C. - 2008
Roma - Foolad F.C. - 2008 to 2009
Igor - Zob Ahan F.C., Rah Ahan F.C. - 2008 to 2012, 2013
Paulo Roberto do Carmo - Persepolis F.C. - 2008
Cristian - Paykan - 2008
Diego Benedito Galvão Máximo - Payam, Esteghlal Ahvaz F.C. - 2008 to 2010
William Moreno - Bargh Shiraz F.C. - 2008 to 2009
Felipe Alves - Malavan F.C., Esteghlal Tehran FC, Zob Ahan F.C. - 2008 to 2012
Sandro Gaúcho - Foolad F.C. - 2008 to 2009 
Luciano Valente de Deus - Foolad F.C., Shahin Bushehr F.C. - 2008 to 2010
Fábio da Silva - Zob Ahan F.C. - 2008
Thiago Junio Aquino - Rah Ahan - 2008
Rodrigo De Santos - Zob Ahan F.C. - 2008
Jelson - F.C. Aboomoslem - 2009 to 2010
Gabriel Schacht - F.C. Aboomoslem - 2009 to 2010
Édson Marcelo de Faria Manfron - Paykan F.C. - 2009 to 2010
Márcio Giovanini - Mes Kerman F.C. - 2009 to 2010
Wésley Brasilia - Persepolis F.C. - 2009 to 2010
Tiago Alves Fraga - Persepolis F.C. - 2009 to 2010
Luiz Carlos Guedes Stukas - Paykan F.C. - 2009 to 2010
Diego José Clementino - Saba Qom F.C. - 2009 to 2010
Ernandes Toretta Junior - Paykan F.C., Saipa F.C. - 2010 to 2011, 2012 to 2013
Marcelo de Faria - Paykan F.C. - 2010
Carlos Eduardo Soares - Shahrdari Tabriz F.C. - 2010 to 2011
Danilo Ribeiro - Shahrdari Tabriz F.C. - 2010 to 2011
Wando da Costa Silva - Saba Qom F.C. - 2010 to 2011
Rodrigo Antônio Lopes Belchior - Rah Ahan F.C. - 2010 to 2011
Cícero Ricardo de Souza - Rah Ahan F.C. - 2010 to 2011
Márcio José Narciso - Naft Tehran F.C. - 2010 to 2013
Jader da Silva Brazeiro - Naft Tehran F.C. - 2010 to 2011
Paulo Almeida - Saba Qom F.C. - 2010 to 2011
Andre Fernández Díaz - Mes Kerman F.C. - 2010 to 2011
André Ronaldo de Souza Esposito - Foolad F.C. - 2010 to 2012
Anderson Ricardo dos Santos - Esteghlal Tehran FC - 2010 to 2011
André Luiz Regatieri - Esteghlal Tehran FC - 2010 to 2011
Paulo Cesar - Shahrdari Tabriz F.C. - 2010 to 2011 
Mateus Alonso Honorio - Steel Azin F.C. - 2010 to 2011
Gaúcho - Shahrdari Tabriz F.C. - 2011
Josiesley Ferreira Rosa - Naft Tehran F.C., Paykan F.C. - 2011 to 2013
Rodrigo Tosi - Tractor Sazi F.C., Esteghlal Tehran FC - 2011 to 2012
Orestes Junior Alves - Damash Gilan - 2011 to 2012
Anderson Gomes - Rah Ahan F.C. - 2011
Leandro Barrios Rita dos Martires - Mes Kerman - 2011 to 2012
Magno Batista da Silva - Damash Gilan, Naft Tehran, Gostaresh Foulad F.C., Sanat Naft Abadan F.C. - 2011 to 2013, 2014 to present 
Bruno Correa - Sepahan - 2012
Luiz Fernando Claudino - Aluminium, Esteghlal Ahvaz - 2012 to 2015
Geílson - Tractor Sazi F.C. - 2012 to 2013
Henrique - Aluminium - 2012 to 2013
Padovani - Foolad, Naft Tehran, Sepahan, Esteghlal Tehran - 2012 to 2018
Chimba - Foolad Khuzestan, Sepahan, Gostaresh Foolad, Sanat Naft Abadan F.C. - 2012 to present
Nilson Corrêa Júnior - Persepolis F.C. - 2012 to 2015
Sergio Rafael da Costa - Foolad Khuzestan - 2013 to 2014
Juninho - Foolad Khuzestan - 2013 
Leandro Chaves - Foolad Khuzestan - 2013 to 2014
Juninho Tardelli - Mes Kerman - 2013 to 2014
Carlos Santos de Jesus - Zob Ahan F.C., Naft Tehran - 2013 to 2016
Tony - Esteghlal F.C. - 2014
Alberto Rafael da Silva - Esteghlal F.C. - 2014 
Maranhão - Naft Masjed Soleyman F.C. - 2014 to 2015
Marquinho - Saba Qom F.C. - 2014 to 2016
Márcio Passos - Sepahan - 2015 
Célio Ferreira dos Santos - Tractor Sazi F.C. - 2015
Tadeu - Persepolis - 2015 
Fernando Gabriel - Persepolis - 2015 
Carlos Cardoso - Tractor Sazi - 2015 to 2016
Renan Silva - Siah Jamegan - 2015
Rivaldo Barbosa de Souza - Esteghlal – 2015 
Fernando - Esteghlal Khuzestan, Gostaresh Foolad - 2015 to present
Augusto - Tractor Sazi, Sanat Naft Abadan F.C. - 2015 to 2016, 2017 to 2018
Lee Oliveira - Sepahan - 2016 to 2018
Cidinho - Sepahan - 2016
Alessandro - Saipa F.C. - 2016 to 2017
Júnior Lopes - Saipa F.C. - 2016 to 2017
Edson Henrique - Machine Sazi, Gostaresh Foolad - 2016 to present
Andrey Nazário - FC Mashhad - 2016
Deyvid Sacconi - Esteghlal Khuzestan – 2016
Fellipe Bertoldo - Esteghlal Khuzestan - 2016
Rafael Roballo - Esteghlal Khuzestan - 2016
Róbson - Esteghlal - 2016 to 2017
Kiros - Zob Ahan, Sepahan - 2017 to present
Claudir - Esteghlal Khuzestan, Padideh - 2017 to 2018, 2018 to present
Jordi Almeida - Tractor Sazi - 2018
Marion Silva Fernandes - Zob Ahan - 2018 to present
Neguete - Foolad - 2018 to present
Tartá - Foolad - 2018 to present
Raphael Silva - Esteghlal - 2022 to present

Bulgaria
Georgi Georgiev – Naft Masjed Soleyman, Gostaresh Foolad – 2015 to 2016
Nikolay Bodurov – Esteghlal – 2020

Burkina Faso
Hervé Oussalé – Persepolis – 2010
Mamadou Tall – Persepolis – 2011 to 2012
Boubacar Kébé – Damash Gilan and Esteghlal – 2012 to 2014
Moussa Traoré – Siah Jamegan – 2016

Cameroon
Jacques Elong Elong – Persepolis, Esteghlal – 2005 to 2009 and 2010 to 2012
Léonard Kweuke – Esteghlal, Steel Azin – 2007 to 2008 and 2008 to 2009
Guillaume Nkendo – Paykan – 2007 to 2008
William Esenjo – Pegah – 2008
Martin Abena – Pegah – 2008
Joël Tchami – Pegah – 2008
Jean Black Ngody – Aboomoslem, Payam – 2008 to 2009
Patrick Jean Matton – Aboomoslem – 2008
David Tahnya Wirikom – Saba Qom, Rah Ahan, Naft Tehran – 2012 to 2015
Mathias Chago – Foolad – 2014 to 2017
Ambuno Achille – Saba Qom – 2014 to 2015
Aloys Nong – Foolad, Naft Tehran and Tractor Sazi – 2014 to 2018
Dorge Kouemaha – Foolad – 2016
Ernest Webnje Nfor – Foolad – 2016 to 2017
Francis Maximilien – Gostaresh Foulad – 2018 to present

Cape Verde
Platini – Sanat Naft Abadan F.C. – 2018 to present

Colombia
Carlos Eduardo Salazar – Mes Kerman – 2011
Victor Guaza Lucumi – Zob Ahan – 2014
Danny Santoya – Sanat Naft Abadan – 2016 to 2017

Costa Rica
Michael Umaña – Persepolis, Pars Jonoubi Jam – 2014 to 2016, 2017

Croatia
Sandro Tomić – PAS Hamedan – 2007 to 2008
Mate Dragičević – Persepolis – 2008 
Mario Garba – PAS Hamedan – 2008
Lek Kcira – Steel Azin, Shahin Bushehr – 2009 to 2012
Marko Šimić – Sanat Naft – 2012
Aljoša Vojnović – Mes Kerman – 2012
Goran Ljubojević – Naft Tehran – 2012
Ivor Weitzer – Malavan – 2013
Leonard Mesarić – Foolad – 2014 to 2016
Igor Prahić – Padideh, Naft Tehran – 2014 to 2017
Mate Eterović – Paykan – 2014 
Pero Pejić – Esteghlal – 2015 to 2016
Luka Marić – Persepolis – 2015 to 2016
Božidar Radošević – Persepolis – 2016 to 2021
Šime Gregov – Tractor Sazi – 2018
Mario Budimir – Persepolis – 2019
Hrvoje Milić – Esteghlal – 2019 to 2021

Curaçao
Sendley Sidney Bito – Fajr Sepasi – 2013 to 2014

Cyprus
Athos Solomou – Rah Ahan – 2016

Czech Republic
Robert Caha – Persepolis – 2005 to 2007

England
Korede Aiyegbusi – Siah Jamegan – 2015 to 2016
Harry Forrester – Tractor Sazi – 2018 to 2019

Equatorial Guinea
Eduardo Ferreira – Esteghlal Khuzestan – 2015 to 2016

Finland
Sebastian Strandvall – Rah Ahan – 2015 to 2016

France
Goran Jerković – Esteghlal – 2012
Jérémy Manzorro – Paykan – 2017
Arthur Yamga – Esteghlal – 2021 to present

Gambia
Alagie Sosseh – Siah Jamegan – 2016

Georgia
Kakhaber Akhaladze – Sepahan – 2003 to 2004
Archil Sakhvadze – Saba Qom – 2004 to 2005
Mamuka Tsereteli – Saba Qom – 2004 to 2005
Akvsenti Gilauri – Esteghlal and Pegah Gilan – 2004 to 2007 and 2007 to 2008
Valter Guchua – Saba Qom – 2004
Vladimir Akhalaia – Esteghlal – 2005
Jaba Mujiri – Sepahan and Foolad – 2005 to 2008 and 2009 to 2012
Georgi Krasovski – Mes Sarcheshmeh – 2011 to 2012
Ioseb Chakhvashvili – Saba Qom – 2014 to 2015
Kakhaber Kakashvili – Machine Sazi and Gostaresh Foolad – 2016 to 2017
Giorgi Gvelesiani – Zob Ahan, Nassaji Mazandaran,Persepolis – 2017 to 2018, 2018 to present

Germany
Ronny Kockel - Paykan - 2008
Bajram Nebihi - Zob Ahan - 2008
Shpejtim Arifi - Payam, Persepolis and Tractor Sazi - 2008 to 2012
Hendrik Helmke - Esteghlal - 2014 to 2015
Markus Neumayr - Esteghlal - 2018

Ghana
Skelley Adu Tutu - Saba Battery - 2004 to 2005
Mohammed Martin Mensah - Zob Ahan - 2007 to 2008
Samuel Sarfo - Saipa - 2018 to 2019

Guinea
Kévin Constant - Tractor - 2019

Guinea-Bissau
Isma - Esteghlal - 2019

Honduras
Jerry Bengtson – Persepolis, Zob Ahan – 2015 to 2017
Eddie Hernández – Zob Ahan – 2018 to 2019

Hungary
Vladimir Koman – Sepahan – 2018 to 2020

Indonesia
Sergio van Dijk - Sepahan - 2014

Iraq

Mohannad Mahdi Al-Nadawi – Sanat Naft Abadan F.C. – 2001 to 2003
Abdul-Wahab Abu Al-Hail – Esteghlal Ahvaz, Sepahan, Foolad – 2003 to 2010
Ahmad Kadhim Assad – PAS Tehran and Esteghlal Ahvaz – 2004 to 2007 and 2008 to 2009
Ahmad Mnajed – Esteghlal Ahvaz – 2004
Bassim Abbas – Esteghlal Ahvaz – 2004 to 2005
Hussam Fawzi – Pegah – 2005
Emad Mohammed – Foolad and Sepahan – 2005 to 2010
Alaa Abdul-Zahra – Mes Kerman and Tractor Sazi – 2006 to 2007 and 2014
Ali Nasser – Paykan – 2006 to 2007
Luay Salah – Persepolis and Aboomoslem – 2006 to 2007 
Noor Sabri – Mes Kerman – 2006 to 2007
Khaldoun Ibrahim – Bargh Shiraz, Aboomoslem, Naft Tehran – 2006 to 2007 and 2010 to 2011
Mohammad Nasser – Bargh Shiraz, Esteghlal Ahvaz, Shahin Bushehr – 2007 to 2010
Haitham Kadhim – Sepahan and Esteghlal Ahvaz – 2008 to 2009
Haidar Obeid – Zob Ahan – 2008
Jassim Mohammed Ghulam – Aboomoslem – 2008 
Salih Sadir – Rah Ahan and Paykan – 2009 and 2011
Hawar Mulla Mohammed – Persepolis and Esteghlal – 2009 to 2010 and 2010 to 2011
Karrar Jassim – Tractor Sazi and Esteghlal – 2009 to 2012 and 2014 to 2015
Fareed Majeed – Naft Tehran – 2010 to 2011
Samal Saeed – Foolad – 2011 to 2012
Marwan Hussein – Sepahan – 2017 to 2018
Bashar Resan – Persepolis – 2017 to present
Humam Tariq – Esteghlal – 2018 to 2019

Ivory Coast
Ismaël Béko Fofana – Zob Ahan – 2012 to 2013
Drissa Diarrassouba – Padideh – 2016 to 2017

Japan
Yukiya Sugita – Tractor Sazi – 2018 to 2020

Takafumi Akahoshi – Foolad – 2019

Jordan
Anas Bani Yaseen - Foolad F.C. - 2019-2020

Kuwait
Waleed Ali - Esteghlal - 2011

Kyrgyzstan
Aziz Sydykov - Naft Abadan - 2019

Lebanon
Ali Hamam – Zob Ahan – 2014 to 2018
Walid Ismail – Zob Ahan – 2014 to 2016
Rabih Ataya – Zob Ahan – 2017 to 2018
Mehdi Khalil – Zob Ahan – 2020 to present

Liberia
Christopher Wreh - Persepolis - 2003

Libya
Éamon Zayed - Persepolis and Aluminium Hormozgan - 2011 to 2013

Lithuania
Egidijus Majus - Steel Azin - 2010 to 2011
Mantas Savėnas - Rah Ahan - 2010 to 2011

Macedonia
Saša Ilić - Persepolis F.C., Esteghlal Ahvaz F.C., Pegah Gilan - 2003 to 2005 and 2007
Ilče Pereski - Persepolis F.C. - 2004 to 2005
Jane Nikolovski - Persepolis F.C. - 2005
Marjan Belčev - Esteghlal Ahvaz F.C. - 2008 to 2009
Zoran Zlatkovski - Malavan F.C. - 2011 to 2012
Aco Stojkov - Zob Ahan - 2012
Vlatko Grozdanoski - Persepolis F.C. - 2013
Bojan Najdenov - Esteghlal F.C. - 2018

Mali
Issa Traoré - Persepolis F.C., Pas F.C., Saipa F.C., Rah Ahan F.C. - 2003 to 2007, 2008 to 2011
Alou Badra Diakité - Shirin Faraz F.C., Steel Azin F.C., - 2007 to 2008, 2008 to 2009
Sékou Fofana - Mes Kerman F.C. - 2007 to 2008
Alou Traoré - Saipa F.C., Tractor Sazi F.C. - 2007 to 2011
Yossi Metsu - Sanat Naft Abadan F.C. 2007
Bakary Diakité - Foolad F.C., Gostaresh Foulad F.C. - 2010 to 2011, 2011 to 2012
Sékou Berthé - Persepolis F.C. - 2010
Founéké Sy - Sanat Naft Abadan F.C. - 2011 to 2012
Idrissa Traoré - Esteghlal Khuzestan - 2013 to 2014
Moussa Coulibaly - Esteghlal Khuzestan, Sepahan, Foolad - 2013 to present
Lamine Diawara - Esteghlal Khuzestan - 2014 to 2015
Soumbeïla Diakité - Esteghlal Khuzestan - 2014 to 2015
Cheick Diabaté - Esteghlal, Persepolis – 2019 to present

Malta
Udochukwu Nwoko - PAS Hamedan - 2010 to 2011

Moldova 
Gheorghe Stratulat - Zob Ahan - 2003 to 2007
Serghei Paşcenco - Malavan - 2012 to 2014, 2015
Alexandru Pașcenco - Naft Masjed Soleyman - 2014 to 2015

Montenegro
Nenad Brnović – Mes Sarcheshmeh – 2011 to 2012
Radomir Đalović – Sepahan – 2012 to 2014
Darko Božović – Zob Ahan – 2012 to 2013
Milan Mijatović – Mes Kerman, Zob Ahan – 2012 to 2014
Marko Šćepanović – Persepolis – 2013 to 2014
Milan Jovanović – Padideh, Siah Jamegan – 2014 to 2016
Bogdan Milić – Saipa – 2017

Morocco
Adil Chihi – Esteghlal – 2016

Mozambique 
Armando Sá – Sepahan – 2008 to 2010

Netherlands
Collins John - Mes Sarcheshmeh - 2011-2012
Donovan Deekman - Naft Tehran - 2015
Jürgen Locadia - Persepolis - 2022-

Nicaragua
Carlos Chavarría – Shahr Khodro – 2019 to 2020

Nigeria
Emmanuel Ezukam - F.C. Zob Ahan - 2003 to 2004
Sambo Choji - Persepolis F.C. - 2004 to 2005
Kabir Bello - Sepahan F.C. - 2005 to 2008
Raphael Edereho - Persepolis F.C. - 2005 to 2006
Daniel Olerum - Foolad F.C., F.C. Aboomoslem, Tractor Sazi F.C. - 2005 to 2011
Taribo West - Paykan F.C. - 2007
Necho Tanna - Paykan F.C. - 2007
Uche Iheruome - Mes Kerman F.C., Shahin Bushehr F.C. - 2008, 2010 to 2011
Edison Joseph - Pas Hamedan F.C. - 2008 to 2009
Obaji Sunday - Shahin Bushehr F.C. - 2009 to 2010
Darlington Iziger - Mes Sarcheshmeh F.C. - 2011
Godwin Mensha - Paykan F.C. - 2016 to 2017, Persepolis - 2017 to 2019, Esteghlal - 2019, Gol Gohar - 2020 to 2021, Mes Rafsanjan - 2021 to present
Rasheed Alabi - Sanat Naft Abadan - 2016 to 2017
Kenneth Ikechukwu - Paykan F.C. - 2017 to 2018
Alhaji Gero - Esteghlal - 2018

Palestine
Imad Zatara - Sanat Naft Abadan - 2012

Panama
José Anthony Torres - Persepolis - 2005 to 2006
Carlos Rivera - Persepolis - 2005 to 2006

Paraguay
Jorge Gaona - Persepolis - 2008

Peru
Rinaldo Cruzado – Esteghlal – 2009 to 2010
Diego Chávarri – Gostaresh Foolad – 2013
Willyan Mimbela – Tractor – 2019 to 2020

Philippines
Iain Ramsay – Tractor Sazi – 2015 to 2016

Poland
Andrzej Bednarz - Saba Qom - 2009 to 2010

Portugal
Ivan Sa Borges Dju – Aboomoslem – 2006 to 2007
Hugo Machado – Zob Ahan – 2011 to 2013
Flávio Paixão – Tractor Sazi – 2011 to 2013
Marco Paixão – Naft Tehran – 2012
João Vilela – Tractor Sazi – 2012 to 2013
Anselmo Cardoso – Tractor Sazi – 2012 to 2013

Republic of Ireland
Anthony Stokes - Tractor Sazi, Persepolis - 2018 to present

Romania
Iosif Tâlvan - Pegah - 2003 to 2004
Claudiu Mircea Ionescu - Foolad - 2012 to 2013
Cosmin Vancea - Saipa - 2013 to 2014

Scotland 

Lee Erwin - Tractor Sazi - 2018 to 2019

Senegal
Issa Ndoye – Zob Ahan and Tractor Sazi – 2005 to 2009 and 2014 to 2015
Ibrahima Touré – Paykan, Persepolis and Sepahan – 2007 to 2011
Arfang Daffé – Paykan – 2017 to 2018
Mame Baba Thiam – Esteghlal – 2018

Serbia
Dejan Maksić - Pegah - 2003 to 2005
Slavko Matić - Pegah - 2004 to 2005
Đorđe Topalović - Esteghlal - 2004 to 2005
Saša Radivojević - Pegah - 2004 to 2005
Boža Đurković - Pegah - 2004 to 2005
Ivan Petrović - Aboomoslem, Persepolis, Shahin Bushehr - 2006 to 2013
Srđan Urošević - Esteghlal - 2007
Nenad Stojaković - Shirin Faraz - 2007
Dejan Pešić - Shahin Bushehr - 2007 to 2008
Ivan Dragičević - Shirin Faraz, Damash Gilan, - 2007 to 2008, 2008 to 2009
Saša Kolunija - PAS Hamedan, Gahar Zagros, Saipa - 2009 to 2013
Milorad Janjuš - Sepahan, Shahrdari Tabriz - 2010 to 2012
Dragan Žarković - Shahrdari Tabriz, Gostaresh Foolad - 2011 to 2012, 2017 to 2018
Goran Lovre - Esteghlal - 2013
Marko Perović - Persepolis - 2012 to 2013
Zoran Knežević - Padideh - 2013 to 2015

Slovakia
Kamil Susko – Sepahan – 2003 to 2004
Miroslav Hýll – Zob Ahan and Bargh Shiraz – 2005 to 2007
Zoltán Harsányi – Paykan – 2010 to 2011

Slovenia
Igor Nenezić – Rah Ahan – 2014 to 2015

South Africa
Ayanda Patosi – Esteghlal, Foolad – 2019, 2020

South Korea
Kwon Jun – Persepolis – 2012
Kim Gwi-hyeon – Sanat Naft Abadan – 2016 to 2017

Spain
Manu – Machine Sazi – 2016 to 2017

Sweden
Kyle Konwea – Siah Jamegan – 2015 to 2016

Syria
Zyad Chaabo – Persepolis – 2007
Tarek Jabban – Persepolis – 2007
Mohamed Al Zeno – Rah Ahan – 2009 
Mahmoud Al Amenah – Rah Ahan – 2009 to 2012
George Mourad – Mes Kerman – 2011 to 2012
Mohammed Estanbeli – Aluminium Hormozgan – 2012 to 2013
Thaer Kroma – Machine Sazi – 2016
Ibrahim Alma – Sepahan – 2017 to 2018

Tajikistan
Akmal Kholmatov – PAS Hamedan – 2010 to 2012
Manuchehr Safarov – Persepolis – 2021 to 2022
Vahdat Hanonov – Persepolis – 2021 to present
Sheriddin Boboyev – Naft Abadan – 2022 to present

Timor-Leste 
Pedro Henrique Oliveira – Sepahan – 2016

Trinidad and Tobago 
Jlloyd Samuel – Esteghlal and Paykan – 2012 to 2015

Tunisia
Mohamed Ali Gharzoul – Rah Ahan – 2012
Hamza Younes – Tractor Sazi – 2015

Turkey
Sezer Güler – Shahid Ghandi – 2005 to 2006

Turkmenistan
Begençmuhammet Kulyýew – Aboomoslem – 2005 to 2006
Gurbangeldi Durdyýew – Aboomoslem – 2005 to 2006

Togo
Franck Atsou – Aboomoslem, Persepolis and Esteghlal Ahvaz – 2006 to 2010
Abdou Moumouni – Aboomoslem – 2008 to 2010

Uganda 
Martin Mutumba – Rah Ahan – 2015

Ukraine 
Oleksiy Polyanskiy  – Persepolis – 2016 to 2017
Volodymyr Priyomov  – Persepolis – 2016 to 2017
Miro Slavov – Shahr Khodro – 2020

Uruguay
Martín Barlocco – Bargh Shiraz – 2007 to 2008
Gerardo Morales – Mes Kerman – 2007 to 2008
Marcelo de Souza – Sanat Naft Abadan F.C. – 2007
Edgardo Simovic – Zob Ahan – 2007
Peter Vera – Foolad – 2007
Freddy Freire – Bargh Shiraz – 2008
Álvaro Pintos – Rah Ahan – 2008 to 2009
César Pellegrín – Rah Ahan – 2008
Cristian Yeladian – Foolad – 2009 to 2010
Rodrigo Odriozola López – Gostaresh Foolad – 2014

Uzbekistan
Zaynitdin Tadjiyev – Saba Battery – 2007
Shakhboz Erkinov – PAS Hamedan – 2008 to 2010
Yaroslav Krushelnitskiy – Mes Sarceshmeh – 2012
Bahodir Nasimov – Padideh – 2014 to 2015
Ruslan Melziddinov – Naft Masjed Soleyman – 2015 
Oybek Kilichev – Paykan – 2015 
Fozil Musaev – Sepahan – 2015 to 2016
Alexander Lobanov – Persepolis – 2016
Aziz Ibragimov – Machine Sazi – 2017
Server Djeparov – Sepahan 2017, Esteghlal – 2017 to 2018
Sherzod Temirov –  Persepolis – 2022 to present
Azizbek Amonov –  Esteghlal – 2022 to 2023

Yemen 
Ayman Al Hagri – Tractor Sazi – 2011

Foreign
 
IPL
Association football player non-biographical articles